Team eventing equestrian at the 2006 Asian Games was held in Doha Equestrian Arena, Doha, Qatar from December 6 to December 8, 2006.

South Korean equestrian athlete Kim Hyung-chil died after falling off his horse on the morning of December 7 during the cross country competition which took place in the rain. The accident occurred at jump number eight during the cross-country stage. After the horse, named Bundaberg Black, rolled over him, he was taken to the hospital, with his death later confirmed by the organizing committee.

Schedule
All times are Arabia Standard Time (UTC+03:00)

Results
Legend
EL — Eliminated
RT — Retired
WD — Withdrawn

References

Results

External links
Official website

Team eventing